Radical 19 or radical power meaning "power" or "force" is one of the 23 Kangxi radicals (214 radicals total) composed of 2 strokes.

In the Kangxi Dictionary, there are 163 characters (out of 49,030) to be found under this radical.

 is also the 23rd indexing component in the Table of Indexing Chinese Character Components predominantly adopted by Simplified Chinese dictionaries published in mainland China.

Evolution

Derived characters

Literature 

Leyi Li: “Tracing the Roots of Chinese Characters: 500 Cases”. Beijing 1993,

External links

Unihan Database - U+529B

019
023